Weinan Normal University is a university located in Weinan city, Shaanxi province, China. It was established as Chishui Vocational School in 1923. The university is entitled to grant bachelor's degrees and jointly trains post-graduates of master's and doctoral level. Presently, it has 61 undergraduate majors in ten different disciplines, including economics, law, education, literature, history, science, technology, management science, art and agriculture. There are 11 schools and two institutions of International Exchanges and Further Education. It enrolls students nationwide. The full-time students, exchange students from Hong Kong, Macao and Taiwan and overseas students from South Korea, Thailand reach 17,000 in total number. The university is composed of three districts, Chaoyang, Xiyue and Hanma, covering 650,000 square meters. Apart from 25 academic databases, the accessibility to 1,890,000 copies of books and 43,5000 electronic books makes the library a good place to study and do research. Currently, the value of advanced teaching and research facilities totals to RMB 1.5 billion.

External links
 Official website of Weinan Normal University

References

Teachers colleges in China
Universities and colleges in Shaanxi
1923 establishments in China
Educational institutions established in 1923